Joseph E. Steinmetz (born January 6, 1955) was the sixth chancellor of the University of Arkansas. He succeeded G. David Gearhart on Jan. 1, 2016, following academic and administrative positions at Stanford University, Indiana University Bloomington, University of Kansas, and Ohio State University.

Career in higher education

Early career
Steinmetz earned degrees at Central Michigan University and Ohio University during the 1970s and 1980s, and then worked as a post-doctoral research fellow at Stanford. He accepted a faculty position at Indiana University Bloomington in 1987, where he taught in the Department of Psychology, the program in Neural Science and the program in Cognitive Science. While there, he was a Distinguished Professor of Psychological and Brain Sciences. In 2006, he was appointed dean of the College of Liberal Arts and Sciences at the University of Kansas with a distinguished faculty appointment as professor of molecular bioscience and psychology.

Steinmetz became Ohio State's vice provost for arts and sciences and executive dean of the then-new College of Arts and Sciences in 2009. His responsibilities included combining five independent colleges of arts and sciences into a consolidated college, the largest arts and sciences college in the country. He also helped enhance the arts district on the Ohio State campus, a project started while he was vice provost and continued after he was promoted to provost of Ohio State in 2013. He also worked to build strong ties between the university and the Columbus arts community.

He has served as editor-in-chief of Behavioral and Cognitive Neuroscience Reviews and Integrative Physiological and Behavioral Science and has co-authored peer-reviewed articles and books on neuroscience and its relation to behavior.

Career at University of Arkansas
The University of Arkansas Board of Trustees named Steinmetz as the sixth chancellor of the University of Arkansas on Jan. 1, 2016. He is the first chancellor in three decades who did not have connections to the University of Arkansas prior to appointment. As a result, his early efforts have been to learn about the university and the state of Arkansas, holding meetings with all academic departments and scheduling a bus tour of the state to meet with Arkansans.  He resigned June 18, 2021, citing the challenge of leading a university in a polarized society.

Personal
Steinmetz is married to Sandra S. Steinmetz, and they have two children, Jacob Steinmetz and Adam Steinmetz, and five grandchildren.

Education
 Doctor of Philosophy, 1983, Ohio University
 Master of Arts in experimental psychology, 1979, Central Michigan University
 Bachelor of Science in psychology, 1977, Central Michigan University

References

1955 births
Central Michigan University alumni
Ohio University alumni
Leaders of the University of Arkansas
Living people
People from Marine City, Michigan